

Austria
 Austrian Netherlands – Prince Charles Alexander of Lorraine, Governor of the Austrian Netherlands (1744–1780)
 Lombardy – Francis III, Duke of Modena, Governor of Lombardy (1754–1771)
 Transylvania – Ladislaus Kemény, Governor of Transylvania (1758–1762)

Denmark
Danish West Indies – Christian Leberecht von Prøck, Royal Governor of the Danish West Indies (1756–1766)

Great Britain
Bermuda – William Popple, Governor of Bermuda (1755–1763)
British Honduras – Joseph Otway, Governor of British Honduras (1760–1767)
Gibraltar – The Earl of Home, Governor of Gibraltar (1757–1761)
 Gold Coast – Nassau Senior, Acting Governor of the Committee of Merchants of the Gold Coast (1757–1761) 
 Isle of Man – Basil Cochrane, Governor of the Isle of Man (1751–1761)
Maryland –  Horatio Sharpe, Governor of Maryland (1753–1769)
New York – 
James DeLancey, acting governor of New York (1758–1760)
Cadwallader Colden, acting governor of New York (1760–1762)

Portugal
 Angola – António de Vasconcelos, Governor of Angola (1758–1764)
 Macau – D. Diogo Pereira, Governor of Macau (1758–1761)

Colonial governors
Colonial governors
1760